Cope's worm lizard (Amphisbaena fenestrata) is a worm lizard species in the genus Amphisbaena.

Geographic range
It is found in the Virgin Island on the following islands: St. Thomas, St. John, Tortola, Great Camanoe, and Virgin Gorda.

References

Further reading
Boulenger, G.A. 1885. Catalogue of the Lizards in the British Museum (Natural History). Second Edition. Volume II...Amphisbænidæ. London: Trustees of the British Museum (Natural History). (Taylor and Francis, printers.) xiii + 497 pp. + Plates I.- XXIV. (Amphisbæna fenestrata, pp. 449–450.)
Cope, E.D. Some remarks defining the following species of Reptilia Squamata. Proc. Acad. Nat. Sci. Philadelphia 1861: 75–76. (Diphalus fenestratus, p. 76.)

Amphisbaena (lizard)
Reptiles described in 1861
Reptiles of the United States Virgin Islands
Taxa named by Edward Drinker Cope